The Babocomari River is a major tributary of the upper San Pedro River in southeastern Arizona. The river begins in the Sonoita Basin near the community of Elgin, Arizona, and flows eastward for approximately  before merging with the San Pedro, just south of the Fairbank Historic Townsite in the San Pedro Riparian National Conservation Area. Vegetation consists of riparian trees along the main channel and small marshy grasslands.

See also

 List of rivers of Arizona

References

Rivers of Arizona
Rivers of Santa Cruz County, Arizona
Rivers of Cochise County, Arizona